Atimono is one of 43 islands in the Manihiki atoll of the Cook Islands. It is a small islet at the southern end of Ngake and to the north of Motu Hakamaru.

References

Manihiki